This is a list of songs that topped the Belgian Walloon (francophone) Ultratop 40 charts in 2004.

Best-selling singles 

This is the ten best-selling/performing singles in 2004.

See also
2004 in music

References

2004 in Belgium
Belgium Ultratop 40
2004

de:Liste der Nummer-eins-Hits in Belgien (2004)